Cosavirus is a genus of viruses in the order Picornavirales, in the family Picornaviridae. Human serve as natural hosts. There are 5 species in this genus.

It is unclear whether cosaviruses are connected to gastroenteritis in humans.

Taxonomy
The genus contains the following five species:
 Cosavirus A
 Cosavirus B
 Cosavirus C
 Cosavirus D
 Cosavirus E

Structure
Viruses in Cosavirus are non-enveloped, with icosahedral, spherical, and round geometries, and T=pseudo3 symmetry. The diameter is around 30 nm. Genomes are linear and non-segmented, around 7-8kb in length.

Life cycle
Viral replication is cytoplasmic. Entry into the host cell is achieved by attachment of the virus to host receptors, which mediates endocytosis. Replication follows the positive stranded RNA virus replication model. Positive stranded RNA virus transcription is the method of transcription. Translation takes place by ribosomal skipping. The virus exits the host cell by lysis, and viroporins. Human serve as the natural host. Transmission routes are fecal-oral.

References

External links
 Viralzone: Cosavirus
 ICTV

Picornaviridae
Virus genera